Estádio Vasco da Gama, also known as Estádio São Januário, owing to its location on a street of the same name, is the home ground of Club de Regatas Vasco da Gama. Its facade is listed by the National Historical and Artistic Heritage.

It is located in the Vasco da Gama neighborhood, Rio de Janeiro, Brazil, on a hill near the National Observatory of Brazil. Because of its position it is often referred to as Estádio da Colina (Hill's Stadium) which in turn has given Vasco the nickname of Gigante da Colina (Hill's Giant). It is one of the few Association Football specific stadiums in the world which has both team benches and coaching areas behind the goal line at the same end of the field.

The stadium had a capacity of 24,584 and it was inaugurated on April 21, 1927, with the presence of Washington Luís, Brazilian president in that time. The first event held in the stadium was a match between Vasco and Santos, which Santos won. The stadium stands as the biggest private venue in the State of Rio de Janeiro.

This stadium has also historic importance, because Brazilian president Getúlio Vargas used it many times to do deliver speeches to the Brazilian people. Vargas announced the first Brazilian work laws on the tribune of São Januário.

Vasco da Gama, owner of São Januário, is the only major football club in Rio de Janeiro to have its private stadium. Other major clubs (Flamengo, Fluminense, and Botafogo) rent their stadiums (Flamengo and Fluminense play at Maracanã which is owned by the state of Rio de Janeiro, while Botafogo plays at Estádio Nilton Santos which is owned by the city of Rio de Janeiro).

São Januário Sports Complex

Aquatics centre 
The São Januario Aquatics Centre opened on August 30, 1953 and is used by the swimming school. In 1998, it held one event of the FINA Swimming World Cup.

Courts
This stadium has two courts. The first opened on September 23, 1956, and it is the main court. In 1999, this court was remodeled and its capacity increased to 2,500 seats. The second court, denominated forninho ("little oven" in Portuguese), is smaller than main and it is located behind the Aquatic park.

Chapel

A chapel, known in Portuguese as Capela de Nossa Senhora das Vitórias, is located between the stadium and the adjacent aquatic park. The project of this chapel was made by Álvaro Nascimento Rodrigues and José Ribeiro de Paiva and it was opened on August 15, 1955.

The importance of this chapel is so big that many projects to remodel the stadium was discarded just because they considered its demolition.

Trophy room
Located just after the stadium front door, the trophy room has about 8,000 trophies, cup, plates, medals and photos earnings on the whole club's history.

Largest official attendances

Source:

Derbies 
Until the construction of Maracanã, Vasco used to play the city derbies at São Januário. After Maracanã was opened, in 1950, the derbies moved to there. Since then, though, a few of those derbies have been played at São Januário, mostly when Maracanã was undergoing refurbishing. On February 14, 2016, Vasco return to play a derby in São Januário since 2005, the match was against Flamengo for the Campeonato Carioca, with Vasco winning, 1–0.

Here is Vasco's home record against its major rivals:

2011 Military World Games 
The São Januario stadium hosted some matches in the men's and women's football tournament at the 5th CISM Military World Games.

See also
Walter Miceli

References

External links

 Templos do Futebol
 World Stadiums
 NetVasco

Sao Januario
Sao Januario
Sao Januario
Football venues in Rio de Janeiro (city)
1927 establishments in Brazil
Sports venues completed in 1927